Léonard Groguhet (1939 – 4 September 2021) was an Ivorian actor and humorist.

Biography
Born in 1939 in Daloa, Léonard was the son of Gbaily Groguhet. He worked as an administrative clerk before completing his military service from 1954 to 1958. In 1959, he moved to Saint-Louis and began studying at the Centre National d'Art Dramatique, where he performed in plays such as Le Médecin malgré lui. In 1965, he enrolled at the Institut d'Études Théâtrales de la Sorbonne, where he studied under Jacques Scherer. He finished his studies at the Université Internationale du Théâtre from 1966 to 1968.

In 1969, he began working for Radiodiffusion Television Ivoirienne and directed programs such as Le Stop dans le vent, Télé-week-end, and Comment ça va ?. In 2007, an Ivorian street was named in his honor, linking Boulevard Latrille to the Lycée Technique in Abidjan. He and Alpha Blondy were two of the few Ivorian artists to be honored this way.

Léonard Groguhet died on 4 September 2021.

Filmography
Mamie Watta (1998)
Un mariage pas comme les autres (2000)
Ma Famille (2002–2007)
 (2016)

Theatre
Pantagleize (Théâtre Gramont, 1965)
La Tribu (1967)

References

1939 births
2021 deaths
Ivorian humorists
Ivorian male actors
People from Daloa